Prithibir Sesh Station is a 1993 Indian Bengali thriller drama film directed by Lalit Mukhopadhyay. The film stars Prosenjit Chatterjee, Madhabi Mukherjee, Anup Kumar and Rupa Ganguly in the lead roles.

The film released on 2 October 1993 is an adaptation of the novel of the same title by Prafulla Roy.

Synopsis 
When Jayanti is accused of killing a man who is believed to be behind the mysterious disappearance of her younger brother, Samaresh her former lover tries to clear her name and solve the mystery.

Music 
The film has soundtrack composed by Rabi Bandyopadhyay with lyrics penned by Barun Biswas.

Tracks 
 Bhalobasi by Shibaji
 Choker Jale by Shibaji
 Khacher Pakhira Aaj by Sandhya Mukhopadhyay
 Kon Holud Ranger by Kumar Sanu
 Rang Beranger by Manna Dey
 Tumi Sandhya by Haimanti Sukla

Cast 
 Prosenjit
 Madhabi Mukherjee
 Rupa Ganguly
 Anup Kumar
 Nirmal Kumar
 Subhendu Chatterjee

References

Sources 
 Prithibir Sesh Station

External links 

1990s Bengali-language films
Bengali-language Indian films